The Beneish model is a statistical model that uses financial ratios calculated with accounting data of a specific company in order to check if it is likely (high probability) that the reported earnings of the company have been manipulated.

How to calculate 
The Beneish M-score is calculated using 8 variables (financial ratios):
 Days Sales in Receivables Index 
(DSRI)
DSRI = (Net Receivablest / Salest) / (Net Receivablest-1 / Salest-1)
 Gross Margin Index (GMI)  
GMI = [(Salest-1 - COGSt-1) / Salest-1] / [(Salest - COGSt) / Salest]
 Asset Quality Index (AQI)  
AQI = [1 - (Current Assetst + PP&Et + Securitiest) / Total Assetst] / [1 - ((Current Assetst-1 + PP&Et-1 + Securitiest-1) / Total Assetst-1)]
 Sales Growth Index (SGI)  
SGI = Salest / Salest-1
 Depreciation Index (DEPI)  
DEPI = (Depreciationt-1/ (PP&Et-1 + Depreciationt-1)) / (Depreciationt / (PP&Et + Depreciationt))
 Sales General and Administrative Expenses Index (SGAI)  
SGAI = (SG&A Expenset / Salest) / (SG&A Expenset-1 / Salest-1)
 Leverage Index (LVGI)  
LVGI = [(Current Liabilitiest + Total Long Term Debtt) / Total Assetst] / [(Current Liabilitiest-1 + Total Long Term Debtt-1) / Total Assetst-1]
 Total Accruals to Total Assets (TATA)  
TATA = (Income from Continuing Operationst - Cash Flows from Operationst) / Total Assetst

The formula to calculate the M-score is:
M-score = −4.84 + 0.92 × DSRI + 0.528 × GMI + 0.404 × AQI + 0.892 × SGI + 0.115 × DEPI −0.172 × SGAI + 4.679 × TATA − 0.327 × LVGI

How to interpret 
The threshold value is -1.78 for the model whose coefficients are reported above.  (see Beneish 1999, Beneish, Lee, and Nichols 2013, and Beneish and Vorst 2020).  
 If M-score is less than -1.78, the company is unlikely to be a manipulator.  For example, an M-score value of -2.50 suggests a low likelihood of manipulation.
 If M-score is greater than −1.78, the company is likely to be a manipulator.   For example, an M-score value of -1.50 suggests a high likelihood of manipulation.

Important notices 
 Beneish M-score is a probabilistic model, so it cannot detect companies that manipulate their earnings with 100% accuracy.
 Financial institutions were excluded from the sample in Beneish paper when calculating M-score. It means that the M-score for fraud detection cannot be applied among financial firms (banks, insurance).

Example of successful application 
Enron Corporation was correctly identified 1998 as an earnings manipulator by students from Cornell University using M-score. Noticeably, Wall Street financial analysts were still recommending to buy Enron shares at that point in time.

Further reading on financial statement manipulation 
 A sequence of articles on Alpha Architect blog.
 An article on Investopedia about different types of financial statement manipulation ("smoke and mirrors", "elder abuse", "fleeing town", and others).

See also 
 Data analysis techniques for fraud detection
 Benford's law

References 

Corporate finance
Financial ratios
Financial risk management
Valuation (finance)